German submarine U-177 was a Type IXD2 U-boat of Nazi Germany's Kriegsmarine during World War II. The submarine was laid down on 25 November 1940, at the DeSchiMAG AG Weser yard in Bremen, as yard number 1017. She was launched on 1 October 1941, and commissioned on 14 March 1942, under the command of Kapitänleutnant Wilhelm Schulze. After a period of training with the 4th U-boat Flotilla at Stettin, the boat was transferred to the 10th flotilla on 1 October 1942, and based at Lorient, for front-line service, she was then reassigned to the 12th flotilla at Bordeaux on 1 December.

Design
German Type IXD2 submarines were considerably larger than the original Type IXs. U-177 had a displacement of  when at the surface and  while submerged. She had two shafts and two  propellers.

U-177 was fitted with six  torpedo tubes (four fitted at the bow and two at the stern), 24 torpedoes, one  SK C/32 naval gun, 150 rounds, and a  SK C/30 with 2575 rounds as well as two  C/30 anti-aircraft guns with 8100 rounds. The boat had a complement of fifty-five.

Operational history

First patrol
Under the command of Kptlt. Robert Gysae, U-177 left Kiel on 17 September 1942, and sailed north around the British Isles. On 23 September, the U-boat was bombed by a twin-engine aircraft southeast of Iceland, but crash-dived and sustained no damage. She then headed south to the waters off South Africa and Mozambique. There she sank eight ships totaling  and damaged another of :

She had her first success on 2 November, sinking the unescorted  Greek merchant steamer Aegeus off Cape Columbine. There were no survivors.

On 9 November, the U-boat attacked and damaged the unescorted  British oil tanker Cerion south of Port Elizabeth with her 37 mm and 20 mm AA guns, after her deck gun malfunctioned, and several attacks with torpedoes failed.

The ship exploded and sank in flames, with only 12 of the crew of 48 surviving.

The unescorted  Liberty ship  was hit by two torpedoes from U-177 on 20 November. The ship's armed guards opened fire with her  and  guns, while the engines were secured; subsequently the eight officers, 33 crewmen and 21 armed guards abandoned ship in four lifeboats. Within half an hour the ship sank. Pierce Butlers third mate was questioned by officers from U-177 who offered to send a distress signal if none had been sent.

The ship was carrying mail, passengers and 780 Italian prisoners of war and civilian internees from Port Tewfik, Massawa and Aden to Durban. Hit by three torpedoes, she sank within ten minutes. The U-boat picked up two survivors to identify the ship, who turned out to be Italian merchant sailors. Mindful of the Laconia Order issued two months previously, Gysae radioed the BdU (U-boat headquarters) and was ordered to continue his patrol while they notified the Portuguese authorities, who sent the frigate  to help. The frigate rescued only 194 survivors. From the 1,052 aboard, 858 were lost, including 650 Italians.

On 30 November, she sank the unescorted  British troop transport Llandaff Castle with two torpedoes southeast of Lourenço Marques. The former Union-Castle Line passenger ship had 150 passengers on board, including six Soviet diplomats with their wives and children and 70 military officers with their families. Three crew members were lost.

U-177 torpedoed the unescorted  Greek merchant ship Saronikos off Mozambique, on 7 December, which broke in half and sank within two minutes. The Germans questioned the only two survivors from the crew of 38, and provided them with bandages and provisions.

The boat torpedoed the unescorted  British merchant ship Empire Gull on 12 December, in the Mozambique Channel, allowing the crew to abandon ship before opening fire with her deck gun, firing 70 incendiary and 100 high-explosive rounds, and scoring about 140 hits, which finally caused the ship to sink.

On 14 December, the U-boat sank the  Dutch merchant ship Sawahloento with her last torpedo, her destruction took seven minutes. The crew of 72 men abandoned ship in four lifeboats, three of which capsized when the boiler exploded, drowning most of the occupants. The 19 survivors in the last lifeboat were questioned, and then set sail towards the coast of South Africa, arriving two days later.

U-177 then headed for France, arriving in Bordeaux on 22 January 1943, after a voyage of 128 days.

Second patrol
U-177 left Bordeaux, 1 April 1943, for her second patrol around the Cape of Good Hope, where she sank six ships totaling . She attacked Convoy CD-20, 27 May, with a salvo of four torpedoes, hitting the  United States merchant ship Agwimonte and the  Norwegian tanker Storaas. Both ships were abandoned by their crews and were sunk with further torpedoes from U-177.

On 6 July the unescorted  Canadian merchant ship  was hit by two torpedoes from U-177, south southwest of Cap Sainte Marie, the extreme southern point of Madagascar. The U-boat fired another torpedo which either missed or was a dud, so she surfaced to sink the vessel with gunfire, but as she did so her target sank.

On 10 July 1943, U-177 struck the unescorted  American Liberty ship Alice F. Palmer, with a single torpedo in the stern, blowing off the propeller and rudder, flooding the engine room, and breaking the back of the ship. The crew of 68 abandoned their vessel in four lifeboats, and after questioning them, U-177 shelled the ship, firing 14 incendiary and 85 high-explosive rounds. The burning ship slowly sank. The four lifeboats eventually sailed to Madagascar.

The  British collier Cornish City was torpedoed and sunk on 29 July, southeast of Madagascar. The ship sank within a minute with the loss of 37 of her crew of 43.

The U-boat successfully attacked the unescorted  Greek merchant ship Efthalia Mari east of Madagascar on 5 August, after spotting her using a Fa 330 Bachstelze rotor kite. Hit by two torpedoes, the ship sank in eight minutes. U-177 was one of only a few U-boats equipped with the aerial observation platform, and the only one to have successfully used it.

The submarine returned to Bordeaux, 1 October 1943, after 184 days at sea.

Third patrol and loss
Under the command of Korvettenkapitän Heinz Buchholz, U-177 sailed from La Pallice, where she had docked 26 December 1943, 2 January 1944, and once again headed south. On the 36th day of the patrol, 6 February, she was sunk in the Atlantic west of Ascension Island, in position , by depth charges dropped by a P4BY-1 Liberator bomber from VB-107.

Summary of raiding history

References

Bibliography

External links

 

World War II submarines of Germany
World War II shipwrecks in the Atlantic Ocean
World War II shipwrecks in the South Atlantic
German Type IX submarines
U-boats commissioned in 1942
U-boats sunk in 1944
U-boats sunk by US aircraft
U-boats sunk by depth charges
1941 ships
Ships built in Bremen (state)
Maritime incidents in February 1944